MV Carolyn Chouest is a chartered support ship for the United States Navy that was originally assigned to the Special Missions Program to support NR-1, the deep submergence craft. She towed NR-1 between work areas, served as a floating supply warehouse and provided quarters for extra crew until the NR-1 was removed from service in 2008.

Since the 2010s the ship has been used to support American special forces units in the Pacific region.

Operational history

She provided underwater mapping of the debris field using the side-scan sonar and recorded underwater video of the site with the ROV Magnum.

December 2006, the fast-attack submarine,  resurfaced during sea trials after a 25-year-old Portsmouth Naval Shipyard employee began having neurological problems. He was safely transferred to Carolyn Chouest and continued to receive treatment from Pittsburghs corpsman until evacuated by a Coast Guard helicopter.

March 2007, NR-1 and Carolyn Chouest under the direction of oceanographer Robert Ballard began mapping the Flower Garden Banks National Marine Sanctuary to help scientists determine where early Americans might have lived when, at the height of the last ice age, sea levels were nearly  lower than they are today.

References

External links

 Military Sealift Command Special Mission Program 
 PM2 - Special Mission Support Force

Research vessels of the United States
Rescue and salvage ships of the United States Navy